Maciej Drygas (born 1956 in Łódź) is a Polish documentary filmmaker.

Career
Following graduation from the Directing Department of the Moscow All-Russian State Institute of Cinematography (VGIK), also known as the Gerasimov Institute of Cinematography, he worked as an assistant to Krzysztof Zanussi and Krzysztof Kieślowski. His first documentary as director was Hear My Cry, about Ryszard Siwiec, who, in September 1968, protested against communist totalitarianism, and in particular the entry of Warsaw Pact forces into Czechoslovakia, by setting fire to himself (self-immolation) in front of thousands of people during the harvest festival at the 10th Anniversary Stadium in Warsaw, an incident that was censored in the media at the time.

His follow-up film, Weightless, looks at the human cost of the Russian space programme.

Drygas is currently director of the radio drama section at the Reportage Laboratory at Warsaw University and also teaches regularly at the Łódź Film School.

Documentaries
Abu Haraz - 2012
Cudze listy / Violated Letters - 2011
Usłysz nas wszystkich / Hear Us All - 2009
Po tamtej stronie / The Outer Limits – 2007
Jeden dzień w PRL / One Day in People's Poland – 2005
Głos nadziei / Voice of Hope – 2002
Schizofrenia / Schizophrenia – 2001
Stan nieważkości / Weightless – 1994
Usłyszcie mój krzyk / Hear My Cry - 1991

Awards

Stan nieważkosci / State of Weightlessness
Prix Italia, 1994
Grand Prix at the Lódź Media Festival, 1994
First Prize at the Balticum Film and Television Festival in Bornholm, 1995
Grand Prix at the International Monte-Carlo TV Festival, 1995
Prix Europa, 1995
First Prize at the International Film Festival Strasbourg, 1995
Grand Prix & Press Award at the Ismailia Festival For Documentary And Short Films, 1995

Usłyszcie mój krzyk / Hear My Cry
Felix - European Film Award for Best Documentary, 1991
Silver Dragon at the Cracow Festival of Documentaries and Short Films, 1991
Main Award at the Media Festival "Man under Threat" in Łódź, 1991
Andrzej Munk Award - awarded by the Film School in Łódź, 1991
Silver Sesterce at the International Documentary Film Festival in Nyon, 1991
Grand Prix at the International Documentary Film Festival in Melbourne, 1991
Golden Gate Award at the International Film Festival in San Francisco, 1991

Other work
Psychoterapia (1983 TV movie)

See also
Documentary film

References

External links
Strictly Film School, Maciej Drygas
Sight and Sound: Maciej Drygas: a forensics of the public unconscious

Maciej J. Drygas at culture.pl
Maciej Drygas at Internetowa Baza Filmu Polskiego 

Polish film directors
Film people from Łódź
European Film Awards winners (people)
1956 births
Living people